Cv Barroso (V-34) is a corvette of the Brazilian Navy, and the lead ship of its sub class. The fifth Brazilian warship to be named after Admiral Francisco Manoel Barroso da Silva, Barroso was launched on 20 December 2002 and commissioned on 19 August 2008.

Service history
On 4 September 2015 the corvette Barroso rescued 220 Syrian migrants in the Mediterranean Sea, as reported by the Ministry of Defense in a statement released on its website. The Brazilian ship was sailing towards Beirut in Lebanon to replace the frigate União as the flagship of the Maritime Task Force (MTF) of the United Nations Interim Force in Lebanon (UNIFIL) when it received an alert from the Italian Maritime Rescue Coordination Centre (MRCC) about a sinking vessel taking immigrants to Europe.

On 27 November 2018 she fired the first Mansup prototype.

Potential foreign sales and upgrades 
In July 2010, after the visit of Brazilian president, Luiz Inácio Lula da Silva to Equatorial Guinea, an order for a Barroso-class corvette was announced. However,  no further news has been announced.

In 2015, EMGEPRON displayed at the LAAD 2015 trade show a model of the Tamandaré-class corvette, a proposed upgrade to Barroso.

References

Further reading
  Retrieved on July 23, 2009.

External links

Inhaúma-class corvettes
2002 ships
Ships built in Brazil